Alkisti Avramidou (born 26 February 1988) is a female Greek former water polo player. 

Avramidou was part of the Greece women's national water polo team awarded the Gold Medal at the 2011 World Aquatics Championships which took place in Shanghai in July 2011.

Club career
 2007–2021 Olympiacos Piraeus

Club honours

Olympiacos
 2 LEN Euro League
 2015., 2021
 1 LEN Super Cup
 2015.
 1 LEN Trophy
 2014.
 10 Greek Championships
 2009, 2011, 2014, 2015, 2016, 2017, 2018, 2019, 2020, 2021
 3 Greek Cup
 2018, 2020, 2021

National team honours
  Gold medal
 World Championship (1): 2011
 Europa Cup (1): 2018
  Silver medals
 European Championship (3): 2010, 2012, 2018
  Bronze medals
 World League (2): 2010, 2012
 Mediterranean Games (1): 2018

See also
 List of world champions in women's water polo
 List of World Aquatics Championships medalists in water polo

References

External links
 
 Alkisti Avramidou – athlete profile at Olympiacos SFP website
 

1988 births
Living people
Greek female water polo players
Olympiacos Women's Water Polo Team players
World Aquatics Championships medalists in water polo
Mediterranean Games medalists in water polo
Mediterranean Games bronze medalists for Greece
Competitors at the 2018 Mediterranean Games
Water polo players from Thessaloniki
21st-century Greek women